Allibond  is a surname. Notable people with the surname include:

John Allibond (1597–1658), English headmaster of Magdalen College School
Peter Allibond (1560–1629), English translator
Richard Allibond (1636–1688), English judge